This article lists political parties in Yugoslavia (1918–1991). Kingdom of Yugoslavia was a multi-party state (1918–1929, 1931–1941) and a one-party state under a royal dictatorship (1929–1931). Socialist Federal Republic of Yugoslavia was a Marxist–Leninist one-party state (1945–1948), a Titoist one-party state (1948-1990), and also a multi-party state for short period before the state dissolution (1990–1991).

List

Kingdom of Yugoslavia

SFR Yugoslavia

See also

List of political parties in Serbia
List of political parties in Croatia 
List of political parties in Bosnia and Herzegovina
List of political parties in North Macedonia
List of political parties in Slovenia
List of political parties in Montenegro

References

Yugoslavia
Politial parties
Political parties
Yugoslavia
Political parties